James Henthorn (1744 – 28 December 1832) was the president of the Royal College of Surgeons in Ireland (RCSI) in 1822.

James Henthorn was appointed Surgeon to the House of Industry Hospitals, on 7 December. He was a member of the Dublin Society of Surgeons, and his name is in the first charter granted to the Royal College of Surgeons in Ireland (RCSI) College in 1784. Cameron states: "here is every reason to believe that the real founders of the College were the elder Dease and Henthorn." He discharged the duties of Secretary to the College for the long period of nearly forty-nine years. Henthorn was Surgeon to the Lock Hospital. When he became a Governor of the House of Industry Hospitals, he was mainly instrumental in inducing the Government to erect the Richmond, Hardwicke, and Fever Hospitals.

Henthorn published some very good papers on the Treatment of Syphilis in the Dublin Hospital Reports for 1808–9. Henthorn was a most amiable man, an agreeable and interesting companion, and warm-hearted friend.    A full-sized portrait of Henthorn, painted by Cregan, is placed beside a similar one of Benny's in the College meeting-room ; they are the only full-sized portraits which the College possess.

See also
 List of presidents of the Royal College of Surgeons in Ireland

References 

Presidents of the Royal College of Surgeons in Ireland
Irish surgeons
1744 births
1832 deaths
19th-century Irish medical doctors